The 1963 Maryland Terrapins football team represented the University of Maryland in the 1963 NCAA University Division football season. In their fifth season under head coach Tom Nugent, the Terrapins compiled a 3–7 record (2–5 in conference), finished in fifth place in the Atlantic Coast Conference, and were outscored by their opponents 201 to 148.

On September 21, Maryland receiver Darryl Hill became the first African-American player to compete in the ACC in the Terps' home game against North Carolina State. Hill was the team's leading receiver but Maryland lost 36–14.

The team's statistical leaders included Dick Shiner with 1,165 passing yards, Jerry Fishman with 480 rushing yards, and Darryl Hill with 516 receiving yards.

Schedule

References

Maryland
Maryland Terrapins football seasons
Maryland Terrapins football